René Dalize, born René Dupuy des Islettes (Paris, 30 November 1879 – 7 May 1917 at Chemin des Dames) was a French writer. He was a friend of Guillaume Apollinaire. Apollinaire dedicated his collection Calligrammes to him.

Works
 , serialized under the pseudonym Franquevaux in the newspaper Paris-Midi.
 With Guillaume Apollinaire
 .
 .
 .
 Posthumous works
 Ballade du pauvre Macchabé mal enterré (1919)
 Au Zanzi des cœurs : comédie en un acte ; préface d'André Billy ; pointe sèche d'Yvonne Préveraud (1931) (with Paul-Jean Toulet)
 Ballade du pauvre macchabée mal enterré (2009)
 Le Club des neurasthéniques, roman inédit présenté par Éric Dussert (2013)

References

20th-century French writers
1879 births
1917 deaths
French military personnel killed in World War I